Chiaroscuro, meaning "light-dark" in Italian, is the use of contrast between light and dark in art.

Chiaroscuro may also refer to:

Comics
Chiaroscuro (comics), various comics, including:
Chiaroscuro (2000 AD), a 2000 AD horror comic series
Chiaroscuro: The Private Lives of Leonardo da Vinci, a 1995–1996/2005 Vertigo comic book
Chiaroscuro (IDW Publishing), a 2000–2005/2007 graphic novel by Canadian artist Troy Little

Music
Chiaroscuro (music), classical Italian vocal technique
Chiaroscuro (Pitty album), 2009
Chiaroscuro (Bass Communion album), 2009
Chiaroscuro (Ralph Towner album), 2009
Chiaroscuro (I Break Horses album), 2014
Chiaroscuro (Ocean Alley album), 2018
Chiaroscuro Records, a jazz recording label based in Wilkes Barre, PA

Other uses
Chiaroscuro (novel), 1912 novel by Italian writer Grazia Deledda
Chiaroscuro, character in Kate DiCamillo's The Tale of Despereaux

See also
 Churrascaria, a type of restaurant